

Eadwulf (or Edwulf) was a medieval Bishop of Crediton.

Life
Eadwulf was elected to Crediton in 909 and built a cathedral there in 910, which later became the collegiate church of Crediton. He was also associated with the founding of the town of Launceston, Cornwall.

Eadwulf died in 934 and was buried at Crediton church.

Supposed epitaph
The Devon historian John Prince (d. 1723) recorded a Latin inscription in verse said to have been engraved on the ledger-stone in Crediton Church of one of the early Bishops of Crediton, he suggested possibly that of Bishop "Eadulph died 932" (sic).  The inscription survives in almost identical wording on the monumental brass of Giles Daubeney, 6th Baron Daubeney (1393–1445/46) in South Petherton Church, Somerset. Also the  first two lines of it were requested by the will dated about 1500 of a member of the Wilmer family of East Leigh in North Devon, to be inscribed on a monumental brass in his own memory. The inscription is as follows:

Translated literally line by line as:

Prince made a verse translation thus:

Notes

Citations

References

External links
 

934 deaths
Bishops of Crediton (ancient)
10th-century English bishops
Year of birth unknown